Joshua Orobosa Zirkzee (born 22 May 2001) is a Dutch professional footballer who plays as a forward for  club Bologna.

Club career

Early years
Born in Schiedam to a Nigerian mother and a Dutch father, Zirkzee began his footballing career as a 5-year-old with VV Hekelingen after the family had moved to Spijkenisse. After impressing early on, he moved to the youth department of Spartaan '20 in 2010, where he played alongside his nephew, Nelson Amadin. He then left for ADO Den Haag in 2013, before ending up in the Feyenoord youth academy in 2016. One year later, Zirkzee left the Feyenoord academy in his native Netherlands to join the youth setup of Bayern Munich.

Bayern Munich
On 1 March 2019, Zirkzee scored a hat-trick in his debut for Bayern Munich II. Just a day later, he scored the winning goal for the under-19 side as they defeated 1. FC Nürnberg 2–1. Zirkzee made his professional debut in the 3. Liga for Bayern Munich II on 20 July 2019, coming on as a substitute in the 74th minute for Oliver Batista Meier in the away match against Würzburger Kickers.

On 11 December 2019, Zirkzee made his debut for the senior team against Tottenham Hotspur in the final group stage match of the Champions League. He subsequently made his Bundesliga debut on 18 December, coming on as a substitute in the 90th minute in a match against Freiburg tied at 1–1; he scored the winner almost immediately after entering the game. Shortly after, Serge Gnabry added another stoppage-time goal to secure a 3–1 victory. Two days later, he again came off the bench in the final minutes of the game and scored the winning goal as Bayern defeated Wolfsburg. On 13 June 2020, Zirkzee scored the opening goal in Bayern Munich's 2–1 win against Borussia Mönchengladbach. He finished off his debut season with a continental treble.

Loan to Parma 
On 31 January 2021, Zirkzee moved to Italian side Parma on a loan deal. The deal included an option to buy. On 2 April 2021, he suffered an LCL injury and his loan was limited to 4 appearances, all as a substitute.

Loan to Anderlecht 
On 3 August 2021, Anderlecht announced the signing of Zirkzee on a season-long loan from Bayern Munich.

Bologna
On 30 August 2022, Zirkzee was transferred to Serie A club Bologna on a permanent deal.

International career
Born in the Netherlands to a Dutch father and a Nigerian mother, Zirkzee is a youth international for the Netherlands.

Career statistics

Honours
Bayern Munich II
 Regionalliga Bayern: 2018–19
 Premier League International Cup: 2018–19

Bayern Munich
 Bundesliga: 2019–20
 DFB-Pokal: 2019–20
 DFL-Supercup: 2020, 2022
 UEFA Champions League:  2019–20
 UEFA Super Cup: 2020

References

External links
 
 
 

2001 births
Living people
Dutch people of Nigerian descent
Footballers from Schiedam
Dutch footballers
Association football forwards
FC Bayern Munich II players
FC Bayern Munich footballers
Parma Calcio 1913 players
R.S.C. Anderlecht players
Bologna F.C. 1909 players
Bundesliga players
3. Liga players
Regionalliga players
Serie A players
Belgian Pro League players
UEFA Champions League winning players
Netherlands under-21 international footballers
Netherlands youth international footballers
Dutch expatriate footballers
Dutch expatriate sportspeople in Germany
Expatriate footballers in Germany
Dutch expatriate sportspeople in Italy
Expatriate footballers in Italy
Expatriate footballers in Belgium